Richard Weber,  (born June 9, 1959 in Edmonton, Alberta) is a  Canadian Arctic and polar adventurer. From 1978 to 2006, he organized and led more than 45 Arctic expeditions. Richard is the only person to have completed six full North Pole expeditions.

Biography
Richard comes from a family of dedicated cross country skiers. He started skiing at the age of two and competing at six. He became a member of Canada's National Cross-Country Ski Team in 1977 and represented Canada in World Championships in 1977, 1979, 1982 and 1985. He retired from cross-country skiing in 1985 (with twenty national titles) and has since been dedicated to Polar and Arctic expeditions. Through the years, Richard has collected several firsts:

 In 1986, in the Will Steger International Polar Expedition, with teammates Paul Schurke, Geoff Carroll, Will Steger and Ann Bancroft and Brent Boddy. Along with this latter, he became the first Canadian to reach the North Pole on foot.
 In 1988, became the first person to reach the North Pole from both sides of the Arctic Ocean.
 In 1989, in the Soviet-Canadian Polar Bridge expedition, 1988, from Northern Siberia to Ellesmere Island National Park Reserve in Canada, he became the first person to accurately stand at the Geographic North Pole (first GPS to register "90" north).
 In 1992, in the Weber-Malakhov expedition, with companion Dr. Misha Malakhov, became the first attempt to reach the North Pole with no outside help.
 In 1995, Richard and Misha's expedition became the first unsupported expedition to reach the North Pole and return to land. The achievement has not yet been repeated.
 In 2006, in the 2006 North Pole Classic, with Conrad Dickinson, became the first to trek to the North Pole using snowshoes exclusively.
 In 2009, he completed an on-foot trek from Hercules Inlet on the Ronne Ice Shelf to the South Pole in a record time of 33 days, 23 hours and 30 minutes. He was accompanied by fellow Canadians Ray Zahab and Kevin Vallely.
 In 2010, he organized and completed an on-foot trek from northern Canada to the North Pole with his son Tessum Weber, and fellow adventurers David Pierce Jones and Howard Fairbank, they went on to set the fastest time to the North Pole (42 days, 18 hours 52 minutes for the 900 km trek).

Together with his wife, Josée Auclair, and their two sons, Tessum and Nansen, Richard operates Arctic Watch, Canada's most northerly lodge located in Cunningham Inlet on Somerset Island in Nunavut. Through their company, Canadian Arctic Holidays, they also outfit, organize, and lead Arctic expeditions and adventure trips, some of them to the Poles.

Degrees
 Bachelor's degree in mechanical engineering from the University of Vermont

Major North Pole expeditions

"Last Degree" North Pole expeditions
In April 1993, Richard and Dr. Mikhail (Misha) Malakhov pioneered the first commercial North Pole expedition allowing people to ski the final 100 kilometres (i.e. from the 89th parallel) to the North Pole. From Longyearbyen (in the Svalbard archipelago), the clients are flown to Borneo, the Russian drifting station, the starting point of the expedition.

Between 1993 and 2005, Richard and Misha have conducted eight of these North Pole Dash expeditions.

In 1999, Jack MacKenzie, a North Pole Dash participant originating from Canada, became the oldest person ever to ski to the North Pole at age 77 years, ten months and 13 days.

On April 23, 2003 Jill and Pete Etheridge, and Alison Sheldrick, three of the North Pole Dash participants, became the first persons to reach the North Pole wearing snowshoes.

Other arctic expeditions

Awards

Honors

What has been said about Weber
 "To my mind Richard Weber and Misha Malakhov are the greatest of all Arctic travellers. Their 1995 North Pole return journey was the most difficult polar challenge ever achieved." (Sir Ranulph Fiennes)
 "The Arctic is a very challenging terrain and in order to face it you need to be with the right people. There are no two better people in the world to be with than Mikhail Malakhov and Richard Weber. They are the best." (Robert Swan)
 "When I first heard that Weber and Malakhov were attempting this trip, I said, 'It's possible. They can do it; everyone one can do it.'" (Will Steger)
 "Above all, Richard got us there and was the best leader we could have possibly had - and the most skilled person on the ice in the world." (Adrian Hayes, 2007 North Pole expedition)

Books

References

External links
 Cross-country skiing
 Canadian Ski Museum - Hall of Fame 
Arctic Watch
 Canadian Arctic Holidays website 
 Beluga Haven
 2007 North Pole Expedition
 North Pole Quest 2007
 Richard Weber’s debrief: Thoughts on North Pole treks in the age of global warming 
 2006 North Pole Expedition
 North Pole Classic 2006 website
 Thepoles.com : This is not the Arctic I saw 20 years ago 
 Cross-country Canada Website - Richard Weber completes another record Arctic trek
 Cross-country Canada Website - Pair on track for North Pole record
 1995 North Pole Expedition
 CBC Radio Archives : Pair pulls off polar adventure - June 15, 1995 
 Outside magazine : Expeditions - The Iceman Conquereth

Members of the Order of Canada
Canadian explorers
Explorers of the Arctic
Canadian male cross-country skiers
1959 births
Living people